Riot on the Dancefloor is the fourth album from German trance group Groove Coverage released in 2012. The album, their first in six years, had four singles: "Innocent", "Angeline", "Think About the Way", and the title track.

Track listing

References 

2012 albums
Groove Coverage albums